"Stones" is a song performed by Swiss duo Zibbz. The song was released as a digital download on 9 January 2018 through 6003 Records, and was written by Zibbz along with Canadian songwriter Laurell Barker. It represented Switzerland in the Eurovision Song Contest 2018.

Eurovision Song Contest

On 9 January 2018, Zibbz was announced as one of the six competitors in the ESC 2018 – Die Entscheidungsshow, the Swiss national final for the Eurovision Song Contest 2018. The final was held on 4 February 2018, and "Stones" was declared the winner after receiving the highest number of points from both the international juries and Swiss public. It represented Switzerland in the Eurovision Song Contest 2018.

The song competed in the first semi-final, held on 8 May 2018 in Lisbon, Portugal. However, they failed to qualify for the final of 12 May.

Track listing

Charts

Release history

References

2017 songs
2018 singles
Eurovision songs of 2018
Eurovision songs of Switzerland
English-language Swiss songs
Songs written by Laurell (singer)